The brown rockfish (Sebastes auriculatus), whose other names include brown seaperch, chocolate bass, brown bass and brown bomber, is a species of marine ray-finned fish belonging to the subfamily Sebastinae, the rockfishes, part of the family Scorpaenidae. It is found in the northeastern Pacific Ocean.

Taxonomy
The brown rockfish was first formally described as Sebastodes auriculatus in 1854 by the French ichthyologist Charles Frédéric Girard with the type locality given as San Francisco, California. Some authorities place this species in the subgenus Auctospina. The specific name auriculatus means "eared" thought to be an allusion to the dark spot on rear margin of operculum.

Description
The Brown Rockfish has a deep body which has a depth of 33% to 37% of its standard length and they typically have spines on the head which has a small terminal mouth. The overall color is reddish-brown with many dark markings, these include a dark spot on the rear upper angle of the operculum. The eyes frequently show a red or orange tint. There are 2 orange or orange-brown lines radiating backwards from each of the upper jaw and the eye. The body is covered in scales. The spines on the head are robust and are made up of nasal, preocular, postocular, tympanic, coronal, parietal, and nuchal spines, although in some specimens the coronal and nuchal spines can be absent and they never have supraorbital spines. The space between the eyes may be flat or slightly bulging. The caudal fin is rounded or truncated. The dorsal fin has 13 spines and 12-15 soft rays while the anal fin has 3 spines and 5-8 soft rays.

Distribution and habitat
The brown rockfish is native to the northeastern Pacific. Its range extends from southern Baja California to Prince William Sound in the northern Gulf of Alaska. These fish are most abundant in the central and southern parts of Puget Sound and from southern Baja California to Bodega Bay in northern California. They also frequently occur around artificial structures and objects such as piers and other man-made objects, like marine debris, such as tires.

Biology
This settlement can take place as early as May and the juveniles and subadults are common close to the bottom in bays and estuaries. In some areas, like San Francisco Bay, the subadults migrate as far as  out to sea from the more sheltered coastal waters. They often mix with copper (S. caurinus), calico (S. dallii), vermilion (S. miniatus) and canary rockfishes (S. pinniger) in deeper water and in Puget Sound they mix with quillback rockfishes (S. maliger). This is a solitary species or one which forms small aggregations and they are typically found in more turbid areas than other rockfishes. Juveniles and subadults are thought to have relatively small home ranges. The juveniles are prey to harbor seals and king salmon. The brown rockfish feeds primarily at night on small fishes, crab, shrimp, and other small invertebrates. During the day this fish tends to lie on the seabed among seaweed or next to rocks or in other hidden locations. Its spines are venomous and can cause painful injuries to the unwary. This is an oviparous species in which each female lays between 55,000 and 339,000 pelagic eggs per year. They are known to live for up to 34 years. They are known to hybridize with quillback and copper rockfishes in Puget Sound.

Fisheries
The brown rockfish was common in fish markets near San Francisco in the 19th Century, as they are caught in bays and other shallow waters. Modern commercial fisheries regard this species as of moderate importance in fisheries for fresh fish and of greater importance in fisheries for live fish. Artisanal fisheries take this species on Baja California. It is an important quarry species for recreational fishers from Puget Sound south to northern Baja. The flesh is said to be palatable, with a mild flavor and the fish are generally fried or, for smaller fish, cooked whole.

References

External links
 Brown rockfish at National Marine Fisheries Service

brown rockfish
Western North American coastal fauna
brown rockfish
Taxa named by Charles Frédéric Girard